is a Buddhist temple in Nara, Japan. Founded in the eighth century, its Kamakura-period Hondō is a National Treasure.

History
The  of 1441 dates its foundation instead to 776. Excavated Nara-period tiles corroborate an eighth-century foundation date. Like other major temples of the period, Akishino-dera had two pagodas, as well as a Kondō. According to the Legends, a fire in June 1135 destroyed most of the temple. Two hundred and fifty-five ofuda, dating from 1327 to 1524, cast light on later years.

Buildings
The five by four bay National Treasure Hondō, with a raised platform, earthen floor, tiled hipped roof, and slightly narrower intercolumniation at each end, epitomises the Wayō style. Built on the site of the former lecture hall, it is a Kamakura-period rebuild in somewhat archaizing style. Inside, a raised altar platform is backed by an internal wall that spans three bays. The Hondō was dismantled for repair and reconstruction in 1899.

Treasures
Statues designated Important Cultural Properties include a Yakushi Triad,  (traditional identification), Taishakuten, and Jizō Bosatsu, in the Hondō;  in the Daigendō; Bonten, Kudatsu Bosatsu (traditional identification), and hollow dry-lacquer fragments, kept at Nara National Museum; Jizō Bosatsu, kept at Kyoto National Museum; and Jūichimen Kannon, kept at Tokyo National Museum. The dry-lacquer heads of Gigeiten and Bonten, along with the heads of Kudatsu Bosatsu and Taishakuten, date from the Nara period and are joined to bodies of the Kamakura period; the hollow dry-lacquer fragments similarly date from the Nara period, while the images flanking the Yakushi, along with the two Jizō and Jūichimen Kannon, are from the Heian period, Daigensui Myōō is from the Kamakura period, and the Yakushi dates from the Muromachi period. Other treasures include a set of five standing ; a  dating to Shōan 3 (1301) that has been designated a Prefectural Cultural Property; and a painting of Daigensui Myōō dating from the Nanboku-chō period and seven Muromachi-period fragments of ema with images of horses, designated Municipal Cultural Properties.

See also
 List of National Treasures of Japan (temples)
 List of National Treasures of Japan (sculptures)
 Shichidō garan
 For an explanation of terms concerning Japanese Buddhism, Japanese Buddhist art, and Japanese Buddhist temple architecture, see the Glossary of Japanese Buddhism.

References

8th-century Buddhist temples
Buddhist temples in Nara, Nara
National Treasures of Japan
8th-century establishments in Japan
Religious buildings and structures completed in 780